Calodesma rubricincta is a moth of the family Erebidae. It was described by Paul Dognin in 1923. It is found in Colombia.

References

Calodesma
Moths described in 1923